Priscilla Alden Morrill (June 4, 1927 – November 9, 1994) was an American actress. She is best known for playing Edie Grant on the sitcom The Mary Tyler Moore Show in 1973 and 1975.

Career

Born and raised in Boston, Massachusetts, Morrill attended the Carnegie Institute before making her stage debut opposite John Carradine in Julius Caesar. She made her Broadway debut in The Relapse with Cyril Ritchard.

Morrill's first television performance was on the Outer Limits episode "The Man with the Power" in 1963.  She was a frequent guest star on numerous television series and in television movies. Morrill had recurring roles on Family, Bret Maverick, Santa Barbara, “The Mary Tyler Moore Show” and Newhart. Jean Stapleton stated in an interview for the Archive of American Television that Morrill was the stand-in for her in the ninth-season episode of All in the Family, "A Girl Like Edith", in which Stapleton had a dual role.

In addition to guest-starring roles, she also co-starred in two short-lived series: In the Beginning starring McLean Stevenson, and Baby Makes Five starring Peter Scolari. Morrill made a guest appearance in MacGyver, in the season two episode "D.O.A.: MacGyver" as Helen Wilson. She made her final onscreen appearance on an episode of Coach in 1992.

Death
On November 9, 1994, Morrill died of complications of a kidney infection at Cedars-Sinai Medical Center in Los Angeles at the age of 67. She was survived by her husband, Paul Bryson, to whom she had been married since 1954. The union was childless. The couple had lived in Port Hueneme, California.
 She was cremated and her ashes scattered at sea.

Selected filmography

References

External links

 
 
 

1927 births
1994 deaths
American film actresses
American stage actresses
American television actresses
Actresses from Boston
Deaths from kidney disease
Infectious disease deaths in California
20th-century American actresses
20th-century American singers